Tennie is a commune in the Sarthe department in the region of Pays de la Loire in north-western France.

Geography
The village lies in the middle of the commune, on the left bank of the Vègre, which flows southwestward through the commune.

See also
Communes of the Sarthe department

References

Communes of Sarthe